Antone Kimball Romney (born August 15, 1925) is an American social sciences professor and one of the founders of cognitive anthropology.  He spent most of his career at the University of California, Irvine.

Romney was born in Rexburg, Idaho in August 1925. He received his B.A. from  Brigham Young University (1947) in sociology, his M.A. from Brigham Young University (1948) also in sociology, his Ph.D. from Harvard University (1956) in Social Anthropology, Social Relations Department. 1955‑56 Assistant Professor, at the University of Chicago. 1957‑60 Assistant Professor, Stanford University. 1960‑66 Associate Professor, Stanford University. 1960‑65 Director, Anthropological Research, Stanford University. 1966‑68 Professor, Harvard University. 1969‑71 Dean, School of Social Sciences, University of California, Irvine. 1969-1995 Professor, University of California, Irvine. 1995- Research Professor, University of California, Irvine. 1956‑57 Fellow, Center for Advanced Study in the Behavioral Sciences, Stanford. 1994 - Fellow, American Academy of Arts and Sciences. 1995- Member, National Academy of Sciences.

Romney married Afton Romaine Barber on June 30, 1945, in Denver, Colorado. Romaine died in Irvine, California on December 27, 2022, at the age of 97.

References

1925 births
Living people
Brigham Young University alumni
Harvard University alumni
Harvard University faculty
Members of the United States National Academy of Sciences
Stanford University Department of Anthropology faculty
University of California, Irvine faculty
University of Chicago faculty